Gustomoy is a rural locality and the administrative center of Gustomoysky Selsoviet Rural Settlement, Lgovsky District, Kursk Oblast, Russia. Population:

Geography 
The village is located on the Gustomoy River in the basin of the Seym, 45 km from the Russia–Ukraine border, 78 km south-west of Kursk, 13 km west of the district center – the town Lgov.

 Climate
Gustomoy has a warm-summer humid continental climate (Dfb in the Köppen climate classification).

Transport 
Gustomoy is located on the road of regional importance  (Kursk – Lgov – Rylsk – border with Ukraine) as part of the European route E38, 0.5 km from the road of intermunicipal significance  (38K-017 – Banishchi – Pristen), 1 km from the road  (38K-017 – Stremoukhovka – Iznoskovo), 7 km from the nearest railway halt 387 km (railway line 322 km – Lgov I).

The rural locality is situated 86 km from Kursk Vostochny Airport, 152 km from Belgorod International Airport and 289 km from Voronezh Peter the Great Airport.

References

Notes

Sources

Rural localities in Lgovsky District
Lgovsky Uyezd